Lin Shu (November 8, 1852 – October 9, 1924;  courtesy name Qinnan was a Chinese man of letters, especially for introducing Western literature to a whole generation of Chinese readers, despite his ignorance of any foreign languages. Collaborating with others, he translated from English or French into Literary Chinese over 180 works, mostly novels, drawn from 98 writers of 11 countries.

Life

Early life and education 
Lin was born in Min County (now Fuzhou City) in Fujian Province, and died in Beijing.  He was born into a poor family. However, he enjoyed reading Chinese books and worked hard at assimilating them. In 1882 he was granted the title of Juren, given to scholars who successfully passed the imperial examination at the provincial level. The young Lin Shu held progressive views and believed that China should learn from Western nations in order that the country might advance.

Translations 
In 1897 Lin's wife died. His friend Wang Shouchang (1864–1926), who had studied in France and hoped to distract Lin from his bereavement, suggested that together they translate into Chinese Alexandre Dumas's La Dame aux Camélias. Wang Shouchang interpreted the story for Lin, who rendered it into Chinese. The translation was published in 1899 and was an immediate success. Progressive intellectuals realized that the effect of translated literature on the public could be exploited for their reform agenda. In Lin Shu's time, many scholars of bourgeois inclination, such as Kang Youwei and Liang Qichao, engaged in  translating literary works and political novels, with a view to promoting bourgeois reforms.

Lin Shu is also known widely as a guwenjia (古文家 master of ancient-style prose), which also casts him as an anchor of the traditionalist cultural politics. Lin Shu used classical Chinese in the translation of novels in an attempt to bridge the gap between classical Chinese and Western literary languages.

On the one hand, he strengthened the narrative function of classical Chinese to adapt itself to a realistic description; on the other hand, he tried to make his translations more succinct than the original by simplification to fit the habit of the Chinese readers. As a famous translator, Lin Shu has used his imagination to communicate with the invisible text and collaborate with the foreign authors.

Lin describes, in his translator's preface to Dickens's The Old Curiosity Shop, how he worked on his translations:

Scholarly comments 
Lin's translations were much forgotten until the essay "Lin Shu's Translations" by Qian Zhongshu appeared in 1963. Since then, the interest in Lin's translations has been revived. In 1981, the Commercial Press, the original publisher of many Lin's translations, reprinted ten of Lin's renditions (in simplified characters, with modern punctuations).

In his essay, Qian Zhongshu quoted Goethe's simile of translators as "geschäftige Kuppler", which stated that Lin Shu served well as a matchmaker between Western literature and Chinese readers, as he himself (a most avid reader of western books) was indeed motivated by Lin's translations to learn foreign languages. Qian also pointed out that Lin Shu often made "improvements" to the original as well as abridgments. According to Qian, Lin Shu's career, which lasted almost 30 years, can be divided into two phases. In the first phase (1897–1913), Lin's renditions were mostly vigorous, despite all the mistranslations. After that, Lin's renditions were dull, serving only as a means to eke out a living.

The following is Lin's rendition of the famous opening of David Copperfield:

The sinologist Arthur Waley held a high opinion of Lin's translations, suggesting they are not inferior to Dickens' originals:

During the New Cultural Movement, Lin Shu was much considered as a defender of Literary Chinese. He did not oppose the use of Vernacular Chinese (indeed he wrote a number of poems in the vernacular language), but he could not agree on the total abolition of Literary Chinese as was proposed then.

References

Sources
Chen, Weihong, and Cheng, Xiaojuan. “An Analysis of Lin Shu’s Translation Activity from the Cultural Perspective.” Theory and Practice in Language Studies, vol. 4, no. 6, June 2014, p. 1201.
Rachel Lung (2004).The Oral Translator’s “Visibility”: The Chinese Translation of David Copperfield by Lin Shu and Wei Yi ,Volume 17, Issue 2, 2e semestre 2004, p. 161–184 Traduction, éthique et société
Waley, Arthur (1958). "Notes on Translation", The Atlantic Monthly, the 100th Anniversary Issue.
Relinque Eleta, Alicia (2021). "Entre tapices flamencos y brocados chinos", in Miguel de Cervantes. Historia del Caballero Encantado. Traducción de Lin Shu de El ingenioso hidalgo don Quijote de la Mancha, Ginger Ape Books&Films, Mil Gotas, pp. 21-45.
Xue Suizhi 薛绥之 Zhang Juncai 张俊才 (ed.) (1983). Lin Shu yanjiu ziliao (林纾研究资料 "Material for the study of Lin Shu"). Fuzhou: Fujian renmin chubanshe.
Mikaël Gómez Guthart. "Lin Shu, author of the Quixote", World Literature Today, July 2018.
Chen, Weihong, & Cheng, Xiaojuan. (2015). A Preliminary Probe into Lin Shu’s Creative Translation. Journal of Language Teaching and Research, 6, 416-422.
César Guarde-Paz (2015) A Translator in the Shadows of Early Republican China Lin Shu's Position in Modern Chinese Literature an Overview, Monumenta Serica, 63:1, 172-192
Hill, Michael Gibbs. “National Classicism: Lin Shu as Textbook Writer and Anthologist, 1908-1924.” Twentieth-Century China , vol. 33, no. 1, Nov. 2007, pp. 27–52.
Huang, Alexander C. Y. “Lin Shu, Invisible Translation, and Politics.” Perspectives: Studies in Translation Theory and Practice, vol. 14, no. 1, 2006, pp. 55–65.

External links
 Biographical sketch and some of his works
 Qian Zhongshu, "Lin Shu's Translation"
 Yang Lianfen, "Lin Shu and the New Culture"

1852 births
1924 deaths
English–Chinese translators
French–Chinese translators
Writers from Fuzhou
Qing dynasty translators
Republic of China translators